War Babies is a 1932 American comedy short film directed by Charles Lamont. It is the second in a series of eight one-reelers that satirized adult films and themes called Baby Burlesks. The casts in the series are pre-schoolers dressed in adult costumes on top and diapers fastened with large safety pins on the bottom.

Shirley has her first onscreen kiss with Eugene Butler. Others in the cast are Georgie Billings, Philip Hurlic and Ashley Shepherd. In 2009, the film was available on DVD.

See also
 Shirley Temple filmography

References

External links 

1932 films
American black-and-white films
Films directed by Charles Lamont
Educational Pictures short films
1932 comedy films
American comedy short films
1932 short films
1930s American films
1930s English-language films